Cyclefly were an alternative rock band from Cork, Ireland, and Antibes, France.

The band toured on both sides of the Atlantic many times, including headline and support tours with Bush, Live, Linkin Park, and Iggy Pop. The band also played at a number of major music festivals, including Reading and Leeds Festivals, Woodstock 99, and Ozzfest. They released two full-length albums; the critically acclaimed Generation Sap in 1999, recorded in the Sound City Studios in Van Nuys, Los Angeles, California, which was produced by Sylvia Massy, and Crave in 2002, produced by Colin Richardson, Bill Appleberry and Tobias Miller. Crave also featured a guest vocal spot on "Karma Killer" from Linkin Park vocalist Chester Bennington.

In the early 2000s, the band dissolved with members moving to 
a band called Hueman. While guitarist Nono Presta went on form alt metal outfit That Falling Feeling.  In the early 2010s, Mako (and later Mako DC) formed through former members.

Discography

Albums

EPs
Dogabone (1995)
Cyclefly (1998)

Singles
"Supergod"
"Violet High"
"No Stress" - UK No. 68
"Karma Killer" (feat. Chester Bennington)

References

External links
 MAKO DC (Cyclefly members Declan & Christians New Project)
 Band Information on Radioactive Records
 Band Information on MCA Records
 Cyclefly Interview

Irish rock music groups
Musical groups from Cork (city)
Glam rock groups